Heroes of the Mine may refer to:
 Heroes of the Mine (1913 film), a British silent drama film
 Heroes of the Mine (1932 film), a British drama film